The 2018–19 Buffalo Bulls men's basketball team represented the State University of New York at Buffalo during the 2018–19 NCAA Division I men's basketball season. The Bulls, led by fourth-year head coach Nate Oats, played their home games at Alumni Arena in Amherst, New York as members of the East Division of the Mid-American Conference.

The Bulls posted a school-record 32 wins, including an NCAA tournament victory over former head coach Bobby Hurley and Arizona State. Their season, which to that point was punctuated by a 13-game winning streak and MAC conference titles (regular and post-season), ended in a 78–58 loss to Texas Tech in the second round. At season's end, Oats departed to become head coach at Alabama despite signing an extension with Buffalo a week earlier.

Previous season
The bulls finished the 2017–18 season 27–9, 15–3 in MAC play to win the MAC East Division and regular season championships. They defeated Central Michigan, Kent State, and Toledo to win the MAC tournament championship. As a result, they received the conference's automatic bid to the NCAA tournament. As the No. 13 seed in the South region, they upset Arizona in the First Round before losing to Kentucky in the Second Round.

2018 recruiting class

Roster

Schedule and results
The 2018-19 schedule was released on August 1, 2018. The Bulls participated in the Basketball Hall of Fame Belfast Classic in Belfast, Northern Ireland.

|-
!colspan=9 style=|Exhibition

|-
!colspan=9 style=| Non-conference regular season

|-
!colspan=9 style=| MAC regular season

|-
!colspan=9 style=| MAC Tournament

|- | MAC Tournament

|- | MAC Tournament

|-
!colspan=9 style=| NCAA tournament

Rankings

References

Buffalo Bulls men's basketball seasons
Buffalo
Buffalo
Buffalo
Buffalo